Gabriel Cohn-Bendit (14 April 1936 – 17 December 2021) was a French activist and academic. He frequented anarchist circles and was part of the far-left in the 1960s and 1970s while later joining the Socialist Party and The Greens.

Biography
Gabriel was the son of lawyer  and jurist , both German Jews who had fled following the rise of Nazi Germany and Adolf Hitler. He grew up in the 15th arrondissement of Paris, sharing a neighborhood with Walter Benjamin, Hannah Arendt, and Max Ophüls. He became a French citizen after World War II, unlike his brother, Daniel, who opted for German citizenship until 2015.

From 1943 to 1944, he lived in hiding with a family of the French Resistance under the false identity of a Belgian refugee. He returned to Paris in 1947 to live with his paternal grandmother. His parents returned the following year, but moved to Germany where his father continued to practice law.

After secondary school, Cohn-Bendit studied philosophy, influenced by Jean-Paul Sartre, who also inspired him to join the French Communist Party. He then joined the Socialisme ou Barbarie movement, headed by Cornelius Castoriadis. In 1959, he moved to Saint-Nazaire after his wife obtained a job there, and he earned a degree in German, subsequently becoming a secondary school teacher of the language. He integrated into his community by meeting local leftist activists, such as Alexandre Hébert of the Workers' Force. In 1962, he joined the Unified Socialist Party.

He taught there until 1987, when he left France for Ouagadougou to serve as a German teacher. However, he was unable to settle into Burkina Faso and returned to France and founded the Groupement des retraités éducateurs sans frontières. In 2009, he applied for Burkinabè citizenship, which he acquired the following year. Throughout his later career, he was known as a "tireless activist of alternative education".

Cohn-Bendit died in Toulouse on 17 December 2021, at the age of 85.

Publications
Le Gauchisme, remède à la maladie sénile du communisme (1969)
Intolérable intolérance (1981)
Nous sommes en marche (1999)
L'École doit éduquer à la désobéissance : le lycée expérimental de Saint-Nazaire (2001)
Lettre ouverte à tous ceux qui n'aiment pas l'école (2003)
École de Tersac, Lycée de Saint-Nazaire : Alternatives à l'Education nationale (2006)
À bas le Parti Vert! Vive l'écologie! (2011)
Pour une autre école, Repenser l’éducation, vite ! (2013)

References

1936 births
2021 deaths
French Jews
French people of German-Jewish descent
French activists
French socialists
French Communist Party members
People from Montrouge
French anarchists